Shorashim is a village in the Galilee.

Shorashim may also refer to:
 Shorashim (organization), a nonprofit organization devoted to building bridges between Jews in Israel and around the world. 
 Shorashim, the fourteen criteria employed by Maimonides in Sefer Hamitzvot
 Shorashim, the principles of Jewish faith as enumerated by Albo in Sefer ha-Ikkarim

See also
 Shoresh, a village in the Judean hills
 Semitic root